St.Thomas Orthodox Church in Sioux City, Iowa is a parish of the Great Plains Deanery of the Diocese of Wichita and Mid-America, part of the Antiochian Orthodox Christian Archdiocese of North America, a constituent archdiocese of the Greek Orthodox Patriarchate of Antioch and All the East. Founded in 1916 to serve the Syrian and Lebanese immigrant community that existed in Sioux City at that time, it is the oldest Orthodox parish in Sioux City and has become a pan-Orthodox community with members from across the Siouxland region.

History
1895
The first Syrian families move to Sioux City.
1905
Fr.Nicola Yanney of the Arab Mission of the Diocese of the Aleutians and North America of the Russian Orthodox Church performs the first Orthodox baptisms in Sioux City.
1916
The aim of the society was to build an Orthodox parish in Sioux City and to establish an Orthodox cemetery. They soon purchased the first church building for St.Thomas at 6th St and Iowa St.
1918
The parish moves the church building to a new location at 8th St and Iowa St.
1928
The Benevolent Society establishes the St.Thomas Cemetery by purchasing land adjacent to Graceland Cemetery. Graceland Cemetery itself had only been established in 1909; since 1953, Graceland Cemetery has been owned by the City of Sioux City.
1930
Fr.Michael M. Yanneynephew of Fr.Nicola Yanneyis appointed as the first full-time rector of St.Thomas by Archbishop Victor (Abo-Assaly), the founding primate of the Antiochian Orthodox Christian Archdiocese. Serving until , he remains the longest-tenured rector in the parish's history.
1935
St.Thomas hosts its first Syrian-Lebanese Dinner. An event that would become popular throughout the Siouxland area, it would continue annually until 2014.
1938
An English-language choir, believed to be the first in any Eastern Orthodox parish in the United States, debuts at St.Thomas.
1940
In , the Divine Liturgy was first celebrated completely in English at St.Thomas; until then, it had only been celebrated in Arabic.
1945
Property is purchased at 1100 Jones St for a new church building.
1952
1969
St.Thomas drops the word "Syrian" from its name.
1979
A new two-story addition is dedicated on  containing classrooms, a meeting room, an office for the rector, and an expanded kitchen.
2006
Fr.Tom Begley leaves after having served at St.Thomas for twenty-two years, becoming the second-longest-serving rector in the parish's history.
2016
Over Labor Day weekend, the parish celebrates its centennial with a visit from Metropolitan Joseph.

Today
Although, perhaps, best known for their food, both St.Thomas and Holy Trinity Greek Orthodox Church are known for the blessing of the Missouri River, performed annually in conjunction with the feast of Theophany.

References

Further reading 

 
 
 
 
 
 
 
 

1916 establishments in Iowa
20th-century Eastern Orthodox church buildings
Antiochian Orthodox Church in the United States
Christian organizations established in 1916
Churches completed in 1952
Churches in Sioux City, Iowa
Eastern Orthodox churches in Iowa
Lebanese-American culture in Iowa
Syrian-American culture in Iowa